Devin Del Do (born May 21, 1986 in Van Nuys, California) is an American soccer player who most recently played for the Tampa Bay Rowdies in the North American Soccer League.

Career

College and Amateur
Del Do grew up in Valencia, California, played for the West Valley Samba club team, and  attended Hart High School where he was twice named to the All-Foothill League first team, and was his team's Most Valuable Player and Offensive Player of the Year as both a junior and senior.

He played college soccer at California State University, Northridge, but suffered two serious injuries which caused him to redshirt his freshman season, and again sit out what would have been his senior year in 2008. He earned All-Big West Conference honorable mention accolades as a sophomore in 2006.

During his college years Del Do also played with Bakersfield Brigade, Orange County Blue Star and the San Fernando Valley Quakes in the USL Premier Development League.

Professional
Del Do signed his first professional contract in 2010 when he was signed by the NSC Minnesota Stars of the USSF Division 2 Professional League. He made his professional debut on April 11, 2010, in a 2-0 loss to the Vancouver Whitecaps, but missed the majority of the 2010 season after suffering a knee injury in just his second professional game.

Del Do moved to Tampa Bay Rowdies on March 13, 2013.

References

External links
 CSUN profile

Living people
1986 births
American soccer players
Cal State Northridge Matadors men's soccer players
Bakersfield Brigade players
Orange County Blue Star players
San Fernando Valley Quakes players
Minnesota United FC (2010–2016) players
Tampa Bay Rowdies players
USL League Two players
USSF Division 2 Professional League players
North American Soccer League players
Soccer players from California
People from Van Nuys, Los Angeles
People from Valencia, Santa Clarita, California
Association football forwards